The 1912 Washington Senators won 91 games, lost 61, and finished in second place in the American League. They were managed by Clark Griffith and played their home games at National Park.

Regular season

Season standings

Record vs. opponents

Notable transactions 
 August 23, 1912: Tilly Walker and Hippo Vaughn were traded by the Senators to the Kansas City Blues for Bill Kenworthy and Bert Gallia.
 August 23, 1912: Joe Agler was purchased by the Senators from the Atlanta Crackers.
 September 16, 1912: Bill Morley was drafted by the Senators from the Knoxville Reds in the 1912 rule 5 draft.

Roster

Player stats

Batting

Starters by position 
Note: Pos = Position; G = Games played; AB = At bats; H = Hits; Avg. = Batting average; HR = Home runs; RBI = Runs batted in

Other batters 
Note: G = Games played; AB = At bats; H = Hits; Avg. = Batting average; HR = Home runs; RBI = Runs batted in

Pitching

Starting pitchers 
Note: G = Games pitched; IP = Innings pitched; W = Wins; L = Losses; ERA = Earned run average; SO = Strikeouts

Other pitchers 
Note: G = Games pitched; IP = Innings pitched; W = Wins; L = Losses; ERA = Earned run average; SO = Strikeouts

Relief pitchers 
Note: G = Games pitched; W = Wins; L = Losses; SV = Saves; ERA = Earned run average; SO = Strikeouts

References

External links
1912 Washington Senators at Baseball-Reference
1912 Washington Senators team page at www.baseball-almanac.com

Minnesota Twins seasons
Washington Senators season
Washington